Oliver Sørensen Jensen (born 10 March 2002) is a Danish professional footballer who plays as a midfielder for Danish Superliga club FC Midtjylland.

Career

Midtjylland

Youth
Sørensen started playing football at Nørre Aaby IK, then at Strib IF and later joined OKS in 2013. From there, he joined the academy of FC Midtjylland and on his 15th birthday, he signed a three-year youth contract with the club.

Sørensen already began playing with the U19s at the age of 16 and was shortly after promoted permanently to the U19 squad despite his young age, after signing a new three-year youth contract in August 2018. The talentfull midfielder once again signed a new three-year deal with Midtjylland in June 2019, where it was also agreed, that he would become a permanent part of the Danish Superliga squad from the 2020-21 season.

Senior
On 28 June 2020, Sørensen made his official debut for Midtjylland against F.C. Copenhagen in the Danish Superliga. Sørensen started on the bench, but replaced Anders Dreyer in the 88th minute. Sørensen was also subbed in a month later in the second-last game of the season against Brøndby IF.

In the first half part of the 2020-21 season, Sørensen continued to train with the first team but did only play for the U19s. To gain some more experience, Sørensen was on 26 January 2020 loaned out to Midtjylland affiliate club, Danish 1st Division-side FC Fredericia, for the rest of the season. Sørensen had a good spell at Fredericia, where he played 11 games and scored one goal. Sørensen returned to Midtjylland for the 2021–22 season.

On 31 March 2022, Sørensen was loaned out to Norwegian Eliteserien club HamKam until the end of the year. He got his debut for the club a few days later, on 2 April 2022, against Lillestrøm SK. However, Midtjylland decided to recall Sørensen on 16 June 2022, presumably due to lack of playing time. Sørensen managed to play just 275 minutes over 6 matches.

References

External links
 Profile at the FC Midtjylland website

Oliver Sørensen at DBU

2002 births
Living people
Danish men's footballers
Danish expatriate men's footballers
Association football midfielders
Denmark youth international footballers
People from Middelfart Municipality
Danish Superliga players
Danish 1st Division players
Eliteserien players
Odense Kammeraternes Sportsklub players
FC Midtjylland players
FC Fredericia players
Hamarkameratene players
Danish expatriate sportspeople in Norway
Expatriate footballers in Norway
Sportspeople from the Region of Southern Denmark